= Lombard Club =

Broken Up European Banking Cartel

The Lombard Club was a European banking cartel broken up by the European Commission in 2002. The Commission found that eight Austrian banks met monthly to organize widespread price fixing across Austria. It organized before Austria was a European Union member.
